The 2012 Northern Mariana Islands Republican presidential caucuses for 2012 took place on March 10, 2012. Citizens of the Northern Mariana Islands send nine delegates to convention.

The caucus will elect six of the nine delegates to the Republican National Convention. Delegates from the Northern Mariana Islands are not technically required to support a certain candidate at the 2012 Republican National Convention in Tampa.

Matt Romney, son of Republican presidential candidate Mitt Romney, arrived in the Northern Mariana Islands to campaign on behalf of his father in the run-up to the caucus. This is the first time in history that any U.S. presidential campaign had visited the Northern Mariana Islands.

Governor Benigno Fitial endorsed Romney for President at a luncheon with Romney's son and daughter-in-law on March 9, 2012.

Results

See also 
 Republican Party presidential debates, 2012
 Republican Party presidential primaries, 2012
 Results of the 2012 Republican Party presidential primaries

Notes

External links
The Green Papers: Major state elections in chronological order

2012 Northern Mariana Islands elections
Northern Mariana Islands
2012